The Ontario Winter Lake-effect Systems (OWLeS) was a field project focused on three modes of lake-effect snow: Short-fetch, long-fetch, and downstream coastal and orographic effects. The project was conducted along Lake Ontario in the Great Lakes region and in the Finger Lakes region of upstate New York. OWLeS occurred in two field phases, one in December 2013 and another in January 2014.  The project is a collaborative effort of nine universities and the Center for Severe Weather Research and is funded by the National Science Foundation (NSF).

Principal investigators 

David Kristovich, Adjunct Associate Professor, Director of Atmospheric Sciences Group, University of Illinois at Urbana–Champaign
Bart Geerts, Associate Professor, University of Wyoming
Richard Clark, Dept. Chairman and Professor of Meteorology, Millersville University 
Jeffrey Frame, Clinical Assistant Professor, University of Illinois at Urbana–Champaign
Neil Laird, Associate Professor of Atmospheric Science, Hobart and William Smith Colleges
Kevin Knupp, Professor, University of Alabama in Huntsville
Joshua Wurman, President, Center for Severe Weather Research 
Karen Kosiba, Research Scientist, Center for Severe Weather Research
Nicholas Metz, Assistant Professor of Geosciences, Hobart and William Smith Colleges
Todd Sikora, Professor, Millersville University
Jim Steenburgh, Professor, University of Utah
Scott Steiger, Associate Professor, State University of New York at Oswego
Justin Minder, Assistant Professor, State University of New York at Albany
George Young, Professor, Pennsylvania State University

References

External links

Meteorology research and field projects
Lake Ontario
Great Lakes